Primula poissonii (海仙花 hai xian hua), Poisson's primrose, is a species of flowering plant in the primrose family Primulaceae, native to wet areas at altitudes of  in western Sichuan and central and northern Yunnan, China.

Description
This semi-evergreen perennial belongs to the Candelabra group of primulas (sect. Proliferae), with leaves forming a rosette, the leaf blades obovate-elliptic to oblanceolate, strongly tapering to base. The flowers are arranged in whorls at regular intervals up the vertical stem.

Cultivation
Primula poissonii is sometimes cultivated as an ornamental plant. It requires a heavy, moisture-retentive, acid or neutral soil in full sun or partial shade. It is an ideal subject for the wet banks of a pond or stream.

References

External links

 Primula poissonii, Franchet, Bull. Soc. Bot. France. 33: 67. 1886.

poissonii